Veeno, is an Italian wine bar restaurant chain in the United Kingdom. 
The company was founded in 2013 by Nino Caruso  and the first outlet was opened in Manchester in November 2013. As of April 2020, the company has 8 outlets: Leeds, Bristol, Chester, Edinburgh, Leicester, Stratford-upon-Avon, Reading (franchised).

In early 2019, after the exit of one of the founders, the company went through a restructure with Rodrigue Trouillet, ex Disney executive, stepping in as Co-owner and Company Director.

Franchising 

Veeno has one franchise operated branch (Reading) and is looking to expand across the U.K. and internationally.

Veeno Bars 

As of March 2022, the company has 9 outlets (Banbury, Bristol, Chester, Edinburgh, Leeds, Leicester, Reading, Reigate, Stratford-upon-Avon).{}

References 

Restaurant chains in the United Kingdom
Italian restaurants in the United Kingdom